Brenna may refer to:

People
 Brenna Hassett, American British bioarchaeologist
 Brenna O'Brien (born 1991), Canadian actress
 Brenna Sakas (born 1984), American beauty queen 
 Giuseppe Brenna (1898–1980), Italian cyclist
 Troy Brenna (born 1970), American actor
 Vincenzo Brenna (1747–1820), Italian architect and painter
 Wilhelm Brenna (born 1979), Norwegian ski jumper

Places

Germany
 Brenna, a fortress of the Slavic Stodoranie tribe at Brandenburg an der Havel, Brandenburg

Italy
 Brenna, Lombardy, a comune in the Province of Como
 Brenna, Tuscany, a village in the comune of Sovicille in the Province of Siena

Norway
 Brenna, Finnmark, a village in Porsanger Municipality in Finnmark county

Poland
 Brenna, Poland, a village in Cieszyn County, Silesia
 Gmina Brenna, a gmina in Cieszyn County, Silesia

See also
 Brenner (disambiguation)